István Jeney (born 27 February 1887, date of death unknown) was a Hungarian rower. He competed in the men's eight event at the 1912 Summer Olympics.

References

1887 births
Year of death missing
Hungarian male rowers
Olympic rowers of Hungary
Rowers at the 1912 Summer Olympics
Sportspeople from Győr